Barryville may refer to:

Barryville, Missouri
Barryville, New York

See also
Berryville (disambiguation)